The Marøysund Bridge is a cantilever bridge in the municipality of Nærøysund in Trøndelag county, Norway. The bridge crosses the Marøysundet strait and the island of Buskholmen to connect the mainland to the island of Marøya. Together with the Nærøysund Bridge, it connects the islands of Vikna to the mainland.

See also
 List of bridges in Norway
 List of bridges in Norway by length
 List of bridges
 List of bridges by length

References

External links
 A picture of Marøysund Bridge

Road bridges in Trøndelag
Nærøysund
Nærøy
Bridges completed in 1978
1978 establishments in Norway